The Kreuzkirche is a Lutheran church in the centre of Hanover, the capital of Lower Saxony, Germany. The Gothic hall church is one of three churches in its Old Town; the other two are the Marktkirche and the now-ruined Aegidienkirche. It was dedicated in 1330 to the Holy Cross.

The church became Lutheran in the Reformation. It was expanded then, and renovated in the 19th century. Destroyed by bombs in World War II, it was rebuilt in simpler form. It received an altar by Lucas Cranach which had been in the Schlosskirche that was not rebuilt. The official name became then Schloss- und Stadtkirche St. Crucis Hannover (Palace- and town church of the Holy Cross). From 1982, the Kreuzkirche parish became part of the Marktkirche parish.

History 
The parish of the Kreuzkirche was in 1284 separated from the Marktkirche parish. A church was consecrated in 1333, built in sandstone masonry, dedicated to St. Spiritus et Crucis (Holy Spirit and Cross). The present church is a Gothic hall church with one nave of four bays and a rib vault.

When the citizens of Hanover accepted the Reformation in 1533, the church became Lutheran, and the first Lutheran sermon was held then in the Kreuzkirche. In 1560, it was expanded to adjust to the different needs of a Protestant congregation. In 1594, a pulpit was installed by Claus von Münchhausen, but moved to the church in Lauenau. The court sculptor  created a carved hanging pulpit in 1756.

The spire of the steeple was damaged by a storm in 1630, and was replaced in Baroque style in 1652. In a "renovation" in 1822/23, many older artifacts were sold or destroyed, leaving the baptismal font as the only medieval furniture.

In World War II, an air raid in July 1943 destroyed the town centre, including the Kreuzkirche. It was rebuilt from 1959 to 1961 in a simplified form, by architect Erich Witt. The Schlosskirche (palace church) was not rebuilt, therefore the Schlosskirche parish used the Kreuzkiche from 1960, leading to the name Schloß- und Stadtkirche St. Crucis.

In 1982, the parish was merged with the Aegidienkirche to the Marktkirche, which is responsible for matters such as building, concerts and expositions. The Sunday services in the Kreuzkirche are often held by the Evangelischen Studierendengemeinde (Parish of Protestant students). The church is a venue for education, guided tours, concerts and other events.

Interior 

The baptismal font was made  1410 from bronze, possibly in Hildesheim. The main treasure of the Kreuzkirche is an altar which Lucas Cranach created and signed, probably before 1537. He made it for the Stiftskirche St. Alexandri in Einbeck, showing a central crucifixion scene, with St. Alexander und St. Felicitas on the side panels, the patron saints of Einbeck. The altar was owned next by the dukes of Braunschweig who placed it in the new Schlosskirche in the Leineschloss from 1666 to 1680. During French occupation, the outer panels were separated, but returned to the Hausmann collection in 1816. They belonged to King George V of Hanover from 1857, and to the Niedersächsische Landesgalerie from 1925. The central panel and the side panels returned to the Schlosskirche sooner. After World War II, the altar belonged to the Church of Hanover.

Three chandeliers were formerly in the Aegidienkirche that was left as a ruin and memorial of the war. Cast in the 17th and 18th century, they had been evacuated before the bombing. It has 34 stops on three manuals and pedal.

Bibliography 

 Ulfrid Müller: Die Schloß- und Stadtkirche St. Crucis (Kreuzkirche) in Hannover (Große Baudenkmäler, issue 373). Munich: Deutscher Kunstverlag 1985
 Klaus Eberhard Sander: Der Cranach-Altar in der Kreuzkirche, seine Geschichte und Eigenart. In: Marktkirche. Published by Kirchenvorstand der Marktkirchengemeinde Hannover. 1990,.
 Heinrich Emmendörffer: Die Kreuzkirche in neuem Glanz. Die Renovierung der Kreuzkirche im Sommer 1991. In: Marktkirche. 1991,.
 Helmut Knocke, Hugo Thielen: Hannover Kunst- und Kultur-Lexikon, Handbuch und Stadtführer, 3rd rev. ed. Hannover: Schäfer 1995,.
 Gerd Weiß, Marianne Zehnpfennig: Kreuzkirche und Kreuzkirchenviertel, in: Denkmaltopographie Bundesrepublik Deutschland, Baudenkmale in Niedersachsen, Stadt Hannover, part 1, vol. 10.1, published by Hans-Herbert Möller, Friedr. Vieweg & Sohn, Braunschweig/Wiesbaden 1983, pp 57ff.

References

External links 

 
 Altarpiece of Hannover Kreuzkirche: The Crucifixion of Christ (central panel) / about 1530 – 1539 / Workshop Lucas Cranach the Elder lucascranach.org

Gothic architecture in Germany
Gothic hall churches in Germany
Buildings and structures completed in 1333
Lutheran churches in Hanover
Lutheran churches converted from Roman Catholicism
Rebuilt churches in Germany
Buildings and structures in Germany destroyed during World War II